Arene cruentata is a species of small sea snail, a marine gastropod mollusc in the family Areneidae.

Description

The shell can grow to be 6 mm to 16.5 mm in length.

Distribution
This species occurs in Florida, the Gulf of Mexico and the Caribbean Sea.

References

External links
 Malacolog info

Areneidae
Gastropods described in 1824